Romanzo d'amore is a 1950 Italian historical melodrama film directed by Duilio Coletti.

Cast
 Rossano Brazzi as Enrico Toselli
 Danielle Darrieux as Archduchess Louise of Austria
 Olinto Cristina
 Jone Morino
 Vira Silenti
 Elena Altieri
 Liana Del Balzo

External links
 

1950 films
1950s Italian-language films
Films directed by Duilio Coletti
Films set in the 1900s
Adultery in films
Melodrama films
Italian historical drama films
1950s historical drama films
Italian black-and-white films
1950s Italian films